Luis Magrinyà (born 1960) is a Spanish writer and translator. Born in Palma de Mallorca, he has lived in Madrid since 1982. He is known as a member of the "Generación Inexistente" of writers. He is best known for two novels: Los dos Luises which won the Premio Herralde and Habitación doble which won the Premio Otras Voces, Otros Ámbitos.

References

Spanish male writers
1960 births
Living people
Spanish translators
People from Palma de Mallorca
Date of birth missing (living people)